Thurman Wesley Arnold (June 2, 1891 – November 7, 1969) was an American lawyer best known for his trust-busting campaign as Assistant Attorney General in charge of the Antitrust Division in President Franklin D. Roosevelt's Department of Justice from 1938 to 1943. He later served as a Judge on the United States Court of Appeals for the District of Columbia. Before coming to Washington in 1938, Arnold was the mayor of Laramie, Wyoming, and then a professor at Yale Law School, where he took part in the legal realism movement, and published two books: The Symbols of Government (1935) and The Folklore of Capitalism (1937). A few years later, he published The Bottlenecks of Business (1940).

Early life and education

Thurman was born in the frontier ranch town of Laramie, Wyoming, which grew to be a small city and location of the University of Wyoming. He was the son of Annie (Brockway) and Constantine Peter Arnold. He began his university studies at Wabash College, but transferred to Princeton University, earning his Bachelor of Arts degree in 1911. He earned his Bachelor of Laws from Harvard Law School in 1914.

Career

Arnold served in World War I, rising to the rank of lieutenant in the United States Army (Field Artillery) and worked briefly in Chicago, Illinois before returning to Laramie, where he was a member of the Wyoming House of Representatives in 1921 and then mayor from 1923 to 1924. He developed a reputation as a maverick lawyer. He was a Lecturer at the University of Wyoming from 1921 to 1926. He was Dean of the West Virginia University College of Law from 1927 to 1930. He was a visiting professor at Yale University from 1930 to 1931, and then professor of law at the same institution from 1931 to 1938. He was a special assistant to the general counsel of the Agricultural Adjustment Administration in 1933. He was an Assistant Attorney General of the United States Department of Justice from 1938 to 1943. As chief competition lawyer for the United States Government, Arnold launched numerous studies to support the antitrust efforts in the late 1930s. He targeted the American Medical Association in their anti-competitive efforts against health plans. The Roosevelt administration later de-emphasized antitrust enforcement, for the stated purpose of allowing corporations to concentrate on contributing to victory in World War II.

Federal judicial service

Arnold was nominated by President Franklin D. Roosevelt on February 11, 1943, to an Associate Justice seat  on the United States Court of Appeals for the District of Columbia (now the United States Court of Appeals for the District of Columbia Circuit) vacated by Associate Justice Wiley Blount Rutledge. He was "kicked upstairs" by President Roosevelt to the Court of Appeals in order to get him out of the Antitrust Division. He was confirmed by the United States Senate on March 9, 1943, and received his commission on March 11, 1943. His service terminated on July 9, 1945, due to his resignation.

Court of Appeals tenure

Although the District of Columbia Court of Appeals had some responsibility for review of decisions by federal administrative agencies, during Arnold's tenure the court's primary role was reviewing decisions of local trial courts involving routine civil and criminal matters arising in Washington, D.C. Arnold was never happy during his time on the court, resigning after only two years on the bench. As an explanation of his decision, he told observers he "would rather be speaking to damn fools than listening to damn fools."

Arnold & Porter

Arnold returned to private practice in Washington, D.C. where, along with Paul A. Porter and Abe Fortas, he co-founded the law firm known today as Arnold & Porter.

Personal and death 

Thurman married his lifelong partner Frances Longan Arnold on September 4, 1917. They had two children, Thurman Jr. and George, both of whom enjoyed successful careers in the law. Nebraskan "Hugh Cox, famous as Thurman Arnold's chief deputy" and also as an early partner at Root Clark & Bird (later Root, Clark, Buckner & Ballantine; later Dewey Ballantine, later Dewey & LeBouef) was attorney for Donald Hiss, brother of Alger Hiss. Both Cox and Hiss were partners at Covington & Burling, where he was called the "perfect advocate") during the Hiss-Chambers Case."

Arnold died on November 7, 1969.

Thurman Arnold Jr. established a law firm in Palm Springs, California in 1953. Thurman Arnold Jr.'s son, Thurman Arnold III, joined his father's law firm in 1982 and is currently practicing law with an emphasis on Family Law in Palm Springs, California. George Arnold married and raised a family with Ellen Cameron Pearson, daughter of columnist Drew Pearson and granddaughter of Cissy Patterson, owner of the Washington Times-Herald.

References

Sources

Biographical sources
 
 Arnold, Thurman (edited by Gressley, Gene M.). Voltaire and the Cowboy: The Letters of Thurman Arnold .

Primary sources
 Arnold, Thurman W. The Bottlenecks of Business.  New York: Reynal & Hitchcock, 1940.  
 Arnold, Thurman W. The Folklore of Capitalism.  New Haven: Yale University Press; London: Humphrey Milford/Oxford University Press, 1937;  1962, with new preface.  
 Arnold, Thurman W. The Symbols of Government.  New Haven: Yale University Press, 1935;  New York:  Harcourt, Brace & World, 1962, with new preface.

External links 

 
 
 
 Arnold & Porter
Inventory of Thurman Wesley Arnold Papers, 1895-19790 University of Wyoming - American Heritage center
Digitized selection of Thurman Wesley Arnold Papers, AHC digital archives

1891 births
1969 deaths
Franklin D. Roosevelt administration personnel
American legal scholars
Princeton University alumni
Harvard Law School alumni
Arnold & Porter people
Lawyers from Washington, D.C.
United States Assistant Attorneys General for the Antitrust Division
Judges of the United States Court of Appeals for the D.C. Circuit
United States court of appeals judges appointed by Franklin D. Roosevelt
20th-century American judges
American prosecutors
Mayors of places in Wyoming
Members of the Wyoming House of Representatives
Yale Law School faculty
People from Laramie, Wyoming
University of Wyoming faculty